Charles Geleyns (c. 1610 – 22 August 1677 in Bruges), also named Carolus Geleyns in Latin or Karel Geleyns in Dutch, was a Flemish Roman Catholic priest, Benedictine monk and abbot of the Saint Peter's Abbey of Oudenburg in the Southern Netherlands. In some older sources his last name is mentioned as Gheleyns. Between 1668 and 1671 he fulfilled the duties of the Bishop of Bruges as diocesan administrator.

References

Year of birth uncertain
1677 deaths
Abbots of the Spanish Netherlands
Belgian Benedictines